Tony Spassopoulos is a former Australian rules footballer, who played for the Fitzroy Football Club in the Victorian Football League (VFL).

Career
Spassopoulos played one game for Fitzroy in the 1985 season.

References

External links

Australian rules footballers from Victoria (Australia)
Fitzroy Football Club players
1965 births
Living people